Kamil Al-Abbasi (born 28 February 1950) is a Saudi Arabian sprinter. He competed in the men's 4 × 400 metres relay at the 1976 Summer Olympics.

References

External links

1950 births
Living people
Athletes (track and field) at the 1976 Summer Olympics
Saudi Arabian male sprinters
Saudi Arabian male hurdlers
Olympic athletes of Saudi Arabia
Place of birth missing (living people)